Alexander Kerr Craig (February 21, 1828 – July 29, 1892) was a Democratic member of the U.S. House of Representatives from Pennsylvania.

Biography
Alexander K. Craig was born near Claysville, Pennsylvania.  He attended the common schools and was educated by a private tutor.  He became a teacher at the age of sixteen, and began the study of law, but devoted himself to agricultural pursuits.  He taught school in winter months and subsequently became principal of the Claysville public schools.  He enlisted in February 1865 in the Eighty-seventh Regiment, Pennsylvania Volunteer Infantry.  After his service, he resumed agricultural pursuits near Claysville, and served as school director and justice of the peace.

Craig successfully contested as a Democrat the election of Andrew Stewart to the Fifty-second Congress and served until his death in Claysville in 1892. He was interred in Claysville Cemetery.

Craig is also credited with the advent of Opposite Day, a form of the liar paradox.

See also
List of United States Congress members who died in office (1790–1899)

References

Union Army soldiers
Schoolteachers from Pennsylvania
1828 births
1892 deaths
Democratic Party members of the United States House of Representatives from Pennsylvania
19th-century American politicians
19th-century American educators